Thomas Ward, Baron Ward of the Austrian Empire (1810–1858) was an English jockey and court favourite, who became finance minister in the Duchy of Lucca.

Life
He was born at Howden, Yorkshire, the son of William Ward and his wife Margaret Marvil. He left school at age 9 and went to work in the stables of Robert Ridsdale. He went to Vienna and was a jockey for Prince Wenzel zu Liechtenstein; and then was head groom for Francis Hunyady.

With a personal recommendation, Ward became adviser to Charles Louis of Bourbon, then Duke of Lucca.In 1843 he brokered an arrangement in 1843 with Archduke Ferdinand Karl Joseph of Austria-Este that traded the political independence of the Duchy of Lucca for financial support to the indebted Duke.

In 1846 Ward was promoted to master of the horse and to be minister of the household and finance, with the title of Baron. In these administrative positions Ward showed ability, but a lack of scruple: he was said to have sought popularity by arbitrarily lowering the price of corn, and the partial default on the debt of Lucca was also attributed to his advice. In 1847, on the death of the Marie Louise, Duchess of Parma, Ward was sent on a mission to Florence to superintend the details of the transfer of Lucca to Tuscany. In accord with the convention of 1818, Charles Louis at the same time succeeded to the Duchy of Parma.

At Parma Ward remained chief minister to the duke, and continued to work in the interests of the Austrian government. He was sent as ambassador-extraordinary to Spain in 1848 to negotiate the resumption of diplomatic relations, and was created a knight grand cross of the Order of Charles III. In the same year, on the accession of Franz Joseph I of Austria, he was deputed to congratulate him, and received the Order of the Iron Crown of Austria. On 20 May 1849 he brought about the abdication of his old patron, replaced by his son Charles III, Duke of Parma. He was now sent as minister-plenipotentiary to represent the duchy at Vienna, and the Emperor conferred on him the Austrian title of Baron.

Subsequently Ward, who was fluent in French, German, and Italian, went on a diplomatic mission to London, and impressed Lord Palmerston. On 21 July 1853 he received a patent of concession of all the mining rights over iron and copper in the duchy.

His old master's widow Marie Louise, Duchess of Parma headed a group at the Parmesan court suspicious of Ward, who had been given an estate at Urschendorff, and the Austrian connection. In 1854 the Duke Charles III was assassinated in the gardens of his palace at Parma, and Ward was dismissed from all his posts. Ward then claimed the protection of Austria, and spent the rest of his life farming near Vienna. He died on 5 October 1858.

Family
In 1838 Ward married Louise Genthner, from a Viennese family of domestic servants; they had three sons and a daughter.

Notes

External links
Attribution

1810 births
1858 deaths
English jockeys
English courtiers
Barons of Austria
People from Howden